"In Our Lifetime" is a song by Scottish pop rock band Texas. The first single from their fifth studio album, The Hush (1999), it was released on 12 April 1999 in Europe and on 19 April 1999 in the United Kingdom. The song peaked at number four on the UK Singles Chart and became the band's second number one on the Scottish Singles Chart. It was also included on the soundtrack of the 1999 romantic comedy Notting Hill.

Content
Texas lead singer Sharleen Spiteri commented on the song:

Critical reception
A reviewer from Daily Record viewed the song as "brilliant". In his review of The Hush, Stephen Dalton from NME wrote that "these 12 tracks perform their ear-soothing job with ruthless efficiency", noting the "opulent swingbeat trundle" of "In Our Lifetime". Sunday Mercury described it as a "great Hong Kong Garden pastiche".

Track listings

 UK CD1 (MERCD 517)
 "In Our Lifetime"
 "In Our Lifetime" (Jules' Disco Trip Mix)
 "In Our Lifetime" (Return To Tha Dub Mix)

 UK CD2 (MERDD 517)
 "In Our Lifetime" (enhanced version)
 "Love Dream #2"
 "In Our Lifetime" (Aim Mix)
 "In Our Lifetime" (enhanced version video)

 UK cassette single (870 918-4)
 "In Our Lifetime"
 "Love Dream #2"

 European and Australian CD single (870 079-2)
 "In Our Lifetime"
 "Love Dream #2"
 "In Our Lifetime" (Jules' Disco Trip Mix)
 "In Our Lifetime" (Return To Tha Dub Mix)

 German CD single (562 055-2)
 "In Our Lifetime" – 4:10
 "In Our Lifetime" (Jules' Disco Trip Mix) – 6:32
 "Say What You Want" – 3:50
 "I Don't Want a Lover" – 5:00

Credits and personnel
Credits are lifted from The Hush album booklet.

Studios
 Recorded at Shar's house and Park Lane (Glasgow, Scotland)
 Mixed at the Mix Suite, Olympic Studios (London, England)

Personnel
 Texas – all instruments, programming
 Johnny McElhone – writing, production (as Johnny Mac)
 Sharleen Spiteri – writing
 Eddie Campbell
 Ally McErlaine
 Kenny MacDonald – additional programming
 Mark "Spike" Stent – mixing

Charts and certifications

Weekly charts

Year-end charts

Certifications

Release history

References

1999 singles
1999 songs
British pop rock songs
Mercury Records singles
Number-one singles in the Czech Republic
Number-one singles in Scotland
Songs written by Johnny McElhone
Songs written by Sharleen Spiteri
Texas (band) songs
Universal Records singles